Bill Amirsjah-Rondahaim Saragih (born January 1, 1933 in North Sumatra; died January 30, 2008) was an Indonesian jazz musician. His albums includes songs such as Billy's Groove and original songs include Anna My Love, which was dedicated to his wife.

References 

Indonesian jazz musicians
Indonesian Christians
People of Batak descent
1933 births
2008 deaths